Cine Español por Movistar Plus+ (formerly Movistar Cine Español) is a Spanish TV channel launched on 21 July 2003. Alongside DCine Español, it was formed DCine Studio, although it was replaced by Cinemanía Clásico one year later.

From 6 November 2009 it aired in 16:9 format permanently. Cine Español por Movistar Plus+ has a schedule exclusively about Spanish cinema, for example Curro Jiménez and La Barraca, and it is also dedicated to Spanish great actors.

Logos

References

External links
 

Movistar+
Movie channels
Classic television networks
Documentary television channels
Television stations in Spain
Spanish-language television stations
Television channels and stations established in 2003